Do You Hear…Christmas is a Christmas album by Heather, Cookie and Raylene Rankin of Canadian folk music group The Rankin Family. It was released by EMI in November 1997.

Track listing
"Rockin' Around the Christmas Tree" (Johnny Marks) – 2:50
"The Christmas Star" (Heather Rankin) – 4:16
"I Wonder as I Wander" (Traditional) – 3:41
"Jesus Christ the Tree of Life" (Traditional) – 4:12
"Do You Hear What I Hear?" (Noël Regney, Gloria Shayne Baker) – 3:45
"Taladh Chriosda (The Christ-Child's Lullaby)" (Traditional) – 4:03
"A'challuinn (The New Year)" (Traditional) – 4:13
"Let It Snow! Let It Snow! Let It Snow!" (Sammy Cahn, Jule Styne) – 2:35
"Quelle Est Cette Odeur? (What Is This Scent So Pure and Lovely?)" (Traditional) – 4:10
"Ave Maria" (J.S. Bach, Charles Gounod) – 2:55
"Welcome Yule" (Traditional) – 3:19
"The Coventry Carol" (Traditional) – 2:43
"Children, Go Where I Send You" (Traditional) – 3:21
"Angels We Have Heard on High" (Traditional) – 4:01
"Oh Night of Joy and Gladness" (Traditional) – 2:55

References

1997 albums
The Rankin Family albums
EMI Records albums